Florian Vogel (born 18 February 1982) is a Swiss professional racing cyclist.
He competed at the 2008 Summer Olympics and the 2012 Summer Olympics.

Career highlights

2000
 2nd  UEC European Junior XCO Championships
2004
 1st in Martigny - Mauvoisin (SUI)
 2nd in Prologue GP Tell (SUI)
2005
 1st  National XCO Championships
 2nd in Frenkendorf, Cyclo-cross (SUI)
2006
 3rd in Fort William, Mountainbike (GBR)
 2nd in Schladming, Mountainbike (AUT)
 3rd in Fehraltorf, Cyclo-cross (SUI)
2007
 3rd  UCI World XCO Championships
 3rd National XCO Championships
 2nd in Uster, Cyclo-cross (SUI)
 3rd in Meilen, Cyclo-cross (SUI)
 2nd in Schmerikon, Cyclo-cross (SUI)
2008
 1st  UEC European XCO Championships
 3rd in Dübendorf, Cyclo-cross (SUI)
2009
 3rd  UCI World XCO Championships
2011
 3rd  UEC European XCO Championships
2017
 1st  European XCO Championships
2019
 2nd  UEC European XCO Championships

References

External links
 
 
 
 

1982 births
Living people
Swiss male cyclists
Cyclo-cross cyclists
Cross-country mountain bikers
Olympic cyclists of Switzerland
Cyclists at the 2008 Summer Olympics
Cyclists at the 2012 Summer Olympics
People from Aarau
Swiss mountain bikers
Sportspeople from Aargau